Jonesboro Community Consolidated School District #43, often known as Jonesboro Elementary School District, is an elementary and middle school district headquartered in Jonesboro, Illinois.  It operates Jonesboro Elementary School (JES).

See also
 Anna-Jonesboro Community High School - The local high school, operated by its own district

References

External links
 

School districts in Illinois
Education in Union County, Illinois